The Russian pavilion houses Russia's national representation during the Venice Biennale arts festivals.

Background

Organization and building 

The Russian pavilion was designed and built between 1913 and 1914. Its architect, Alexey Shchusev, used motifs from 17th and 18th century Russian architecture.

In 1922, 1938–1954, and 1978–1980 pavilion was closed. In both 1926 and 1936 Russian pavilion hosted exhibition of Italian Futurism curated by Filippo Tommaso Marinetti.

Representation by year

Art 

 1914 — Group exhibition of 68 artists, including Léon Bakst, Isaak Brodsky, Mikhail Vrubel, Mstislav Dobuzhinsky, Boris Kustodiev
 1920 — Group exhibition of 20 artists, including Aleksandr Arсhipenko, Marianne von Werefkin, Natalia Goncharova, Boris Grigoriev, Mikhail Larionov, Dmitry Stelletsky, Alexej von Jawlensky
 1924 — Group exhibition of 97 artists, including Nathan Altman, Lev Bruni, Igor Grabar, Boris Kustodiev, Aristarkh Lentulov, Kazimir Malevich, Mikhail Matyushin, Ilya Mashkov, Kuzma Petrov-Vodkin, Lyubov Popova, Nadezhda Udaltsova, Robert Falk, Vassily Chekrygin, Sergei Chekhonin, David Shterenberg, Alexandra Ekster
 1928 — Group exhibition of 72 artists, including Nathan Altman, Abram Arkhipov, Aleksandr Deineka, Petr Kontchalovsky, Elizaveta Kruglikova, Kuzma Petrov-Vodkin, Yuriy Pimenov, Robert Falk
 1930 — Group exhibition of 47 artists, including Aleksandr Deineka, Aleksandr Labas, Aristarkh Lentulov, Yuriy Pimenov, David Schterenberg
 1932 — Group exhibition of 49 artists, including Isaak Brodsky, Aleksandr Deineka, Petr Konchalovsky, Aleksandr Labas, Kuzma Petrov-Vodkin, Yuriy Pimenov, David Schterenberg
 1934 — Group exhibition of 23 artists, including Isaak Brodsky, Aleksandr Deineka, Vera Mukhina, Kuzma Petrov-Vodkin
 1956 — Group exhibition of 72 artists, including Igor Grabar, Aleksandr Deineka, Boris Ioganson, Petr Konchalovsky, Pavel Korin, Ilya Mashkov, Vera Mukhina, Georgy Nissky, Yuriy Pimenov, Nadezhda Udaltsova, Semen Chuikov, Kukryniksy
 1958 — Group exhibition of 17 artists, including Evgeny Vuchetich, Sergej Gerasimov, Kukryniksy, Georgy Nissky, Yuriy Pimenov, Arkady Plastov
 1960 — Group exhibition of 22 artists, including Aleksandr Deineka, Kukryniksy, Dmitry Moor, Vera Mukhina, Andrey Mylnikov, Georgy Nissky (Commissioner: Irina Antonova)
 1962 — Group exhibition of 12 artists, including Mikhail Anikushin, Sergey Konenkov, Geliy Korzhev, Viktor Popkov, Tair Salakhov (Commissioner: Larissa Salmina)
 1964 — Group exhibition of 42 artists, including Aleksandr Deineka, Pavel Korin, Evsey Moiseenko, Vladimir Stozharov, Evgeny Vuchetich
 1966 — Group exhibition of 26 artists, including Vladimir Stozharov, Dmitry Zhilinsky, Misha Brusilovsky
 1968 — Group exhibition of 15 artists, including Dmitry Bisti, Arkady Plastov, Yuri Vasnetsov
 1970 — Nikolay Andreev, Aleksandr Deineka
 1972 — Group exhibition of 31 artists, including Evsey Moiseenko, Kuzma Petrov-Vodkin, Nikolay Tomsky
 1976 — Group exhibition of 45 artists, including Georgy Nissky, Yuriy Pimenov, Tair Salakhov, Vladimir Stozharov
 1977 — Group exhibition of 99 artists in frames of Biennale of Dissident, including Erik Bulatov, Ilya Kabakov, Andrey Monastyrsky, Oskar Rabin, Oleg Vasiliev, Anatoly Zverev
 1982 — Group exhibition of 32 artists, including Tatiana Nazarenko, Viktor Popkov, Dmitry Zhilinsky
 1984 — Group exhibition of 6 artists, including Nikolay Akimov, Aleksandr Tyshler
 1986 — Group exhibition of 23 artists, including Dmitry Bisti, Vladimir Favorsky
 1988 — Aristarkh Lentulov
 1990 — Group exhibition of 7 artists, including Evgeny Mitta, Robert Rauschenberg, Aidan Salakhova
 1993 — Ilya Kabakov
 1995 — Evgeny Asse, Dmitry Gutov, Vadim Fishkin (Commissioner: Victor Misiano)
 1997 — Maksim Kantor (Commissioner: Konstantin Bokhorov; curator: Yury Nikich)
 1999 — Sergey Bugaev (Afrika), Vitaly Komar & Aleksandr Melamid (Commissioner: Konstantin Bokhorov; curators: Olesya Turkina, Joseph Bakshtein)
 2001 — Leonid Sokov, Olga Chernyshova, Sergey Shutov (Commissioner: Leonid Bazhanov; curator: Ekaterina Degot)
 2003 — Sergey Bratkov, Aleksandr Vinogradov & Vladimir Dubossarsky, Konstantin Zvezdochetov, Valery Koshlyakov (Commissioner: Evgeny Zyablov; curator: Victor Misiano)
 2005 — Provmyza group, Program 'Escape' (Commissioner: Evgeny Zyablov; curators: Olga Lopukhova, Lyubov Saprykina)
 2007 — AES+F, Andrey Bartenev, Georgy Frangulian, Arseny Mescheryarov, Julia Milner, Alexandr Ponomarev (Commissioner: Vassily Tsereteli; curator: Olga Sviblova)
 2009 — Alexei Kallima, Andrei Molodkine, Gosha Ostretsov, Anatoly Zhuravlev, Sergei Shekhovtsov, Irina Korina, Pavel Peppershtein (Commissioner: Vassily Tsereteli; curator: Olga Sviblova)
 2011 — Andrey Monastyrsky and "Collective Actions" group (Elena Elagina, Sabina Hensgen, Igor Makarevich, Nikolai Pantikov, Sergei Romashko and others) (Commissioner: Stella Kesaeva; curator: Boris Groys)
 2013 — Vadim Zakharov (Commissioner: Stella Kesaeva; curator: Udo Kittelmann)
 2015 — Irina Nakhova (Commissioner: Stella Kesaeva; curator: Margarita Tupitsyn)
 2017 — Grisha Bruskin, Sasha Pirogova (ru), Georgy Kuznetsov, Andrei Blokhin (Curator: Semyon Mikhailovsky)

References

Bibliography

Further reading

External links 

 

National pavilions
Russian contemporary art